Suraj Vasudevan  (born 30 June 1976), professionally credited as Suraj Venjaramoodu, is an Indian actor, comedian, impressionist, and television presenter, who appears in Malayalam films, television and stage plays. He has acted in more than 250 films. He has won a National Film Award and three Kerala State Film Awards.

Throughout the 2000s and towards mid-2010s, he played comedic roles in numerous films and won the Kerala State Film Award for Best Comedian three times (2009, 2010, 2013). In his later career, he found success in playing character and leading roles. In 2013, Suraj won the National Film Award for Best Actor for his lead role in Perariyathavar. In 2019, he won Kerala State Film Award for Best Actor for Android Kunjappan Version 5.25 and Vikruthi.

Early life
Suraj is the youngest of the three children of Venjaramood K. Vasudevan Nair, a retired soldier from the Indian Army and Vilasini, a housewife. He was called "Kuttappan" by his parents and relatives. His elder V. Saji, was also an officer in Indian Army. His other sister Sunitha V. V. is married and settled in Thiruvananthapuram. Suraj also wanted to serve the Army after completing his Secondary School Leaving Certificate, but had to give up as he broke his arm in a bicycle accident. He received his primary education from K.V.M.L.P.S, Venjaramoodu. He completed his Mechanical diploma course from Government ITI, Attingal and turned to mimicry soon after. His breakthrough with Jagapoka, a comedy program which was broadcast on Kairali TV.

Film career
Suraj started his career as a stand-up comedian. His mimicry shows were a success with the audience and he was noted for his artificial mockery of the Thiruvananthapuram accent. Later, he was also criticised for this from some audience during his early film career. He first acted in a film named Jagapoka which was a spoof of Malayalam movies. He played the role of Pachan as well as Dadasahib in this film. However the movie was a box office flop and received negative reviews. Suraj then went on to act in several minor roles in films such as Rasikan, Achuvinte Amma, Bus Conductor and Rasathanthram. Suraj grabbed the attention in Malayalam film industry after he assisted Mammootty with the Thiruvananthapuram accent in Rajamanikyam (2005). He would go on to act alongside Mammootty in many comedy films. The duo is considered one of the most memorable onscreen duos in Malayalam cinema. His first breakthrough came with Thuruppugulan (2006) where he played the sidekick role for the character of Mammootty. Suraj then went on to play the comedy roles in several hit films such as Classmates, Pachakkuthira, Chotta Mumbai and Hallo. In 2007, he got his first major supporting role in Mayavi, which became another major breakthrough in his career. Suraj received appreciation for his role as Peethamparan in Annan Thambi and Jabbar in Lollipop, both of which released in 2008. He played the lead role for the first time with Duplicate (2009). Suraj's iconic comedy character Dasamoolam Damu came out with the movie Chattambinaadu (2009). The character became popular several years after the release of Chattambinaadu and eventually attained a cult status. He won his first Kerala State Film Award in 2009, by winning the award for the Best Comedian for his performance in Ivar Vivahitharayal. He won the award again two times in 2010 and 2013 for the movies Oru Naal Varum and Daivathinte Swantham Cleetus respectively. Suraj's another popular comedy character is Idivettu Sugunan which came out with Pokkiriraja (2010). He was also praised for his role as Vadivelu in the Dileep starrer comedy movie Karyasthan. Suraj played some memorable roles in the movies China Town and Teja Bhai & family, both released in 2011. His other memorable comedy roles came out with the movies such as Mallu Singh, Mr. Marumakan, 101 Weddings, Manthrikan, Sound Thoma, Pullipulikalum Aattinkuttiyum, Ring Master, Bhaiyya Bhaiyya, Cousins and Two Countries.

Suraj's potential to play the character and lead roles came out in 2013 as he won that year's National Award for his performance in Perariyathavar, at the 61st National Film Awards. Noted filmmaker and jury chairman Saeed Mirza, while announcing Suraj's award in a press meet, said: "Suraj has played a municipal sweeper [in the film] but it is an incredibly dignified performance. He excels in comedy but in this film Suraj has brilliantly played a reticent character. I would not have been able to sleep had his name not been in the list of awardees".

Suraj received critical appreciation for his acting with a potent cameo in Action Hero Biju (2016). This movie was also a turning point in his career and a breakthrough performance as he underwent a complete evolution with his acting. In Karinkunnam 6's, he portrayed a ruthless police officer and in Oru Muthassi Gadha, he played the lead role. Suraj returned to do the comedy role with the 2016 blockbuster Pulimurugan. In the movie Aby (2017) he played the character of a selfish neighbour. Suraj's another critically acclaimed performance came out with Thondimuthalum Driksakshiyum (2017), where he played a lead character alongside Fahad Fasil, who also received appreciation for his performance. He went on to play lead roles in Varnyathil Aashanka and Kuttanpillayude Sivarathri (2018). He bagged the Kerala State Film Award for the Best Actor in 2019 for his performance in Vikruthi and Android Kunjappan Version 5.25, both the films in which he played a lead role alongside Soubin Shahir. His performance in Driving License alongside Prithviraj also received appreciation. In 2021, Suraj played the lead role in The Great Indian Kitchen which received positive reactions from various film critics and was well received by the audience. In 2022, he played a pivotal role in Prithviraj starrer Jana Gana Mana which was critically acclaimed and was a commercial success.

Personal life
In 2005, Suraj married Supriya at Vaikuntam Auditorium, near Padmanabhaswamy Temple. They have three children: Kashinathan, Vasudev and Hridya. Kashinathan has acted in the films Annan Thampi and Teja Bhai & Family.

Awards and nominations

Filmography

Films

Television

As dubbing artist
 Ivan Maryadaraman - Voice for cycle
 Shivam - For Rajan P Dev
 Chirikudukka
Bus Conductor-For Kulappulli Leela (small portion)

References

External links

 
 Profile
 Interview on JB Junction – YouTube

Indian male film actors
Male actors from Thiruvananthapuram
Living people
1976 births
Male actors in Malayalam cinema
Indian male comedians
Best Actor National Film Award winners
21st-century Indian male actors
Malayalam comedians
Indian male television actors
Male actors in Malayalam television
Indian male voice actors
Male actors in Hindi television